The Orinoco is a river in Venezuela and Colombia.

Orinoco may also refer to:

Places
 Orinoco Belt, an oil field in Venezuela
 Orinoco Delta, a river delta of the Orinoco River, in Venezuela
 Alto Orinoco Municipality, Amazonas, Venezuela
 Caicara del Orinoco, a town in Venezuela

Other uses
 Orinoco (album), a 2019 album by Cimarrón
 "Orinoco Flow", also released as "Orinoco Flow (Sail Away)", a song by Irish singer-songwriter Enya 
 ORiNOCO, a Wi-Fi chipset product family
 Orinoco Studios, a defunct recording studio now part of Miloco Studios in London, England
 Orinoco, a fictional Danube class starship in Star Trek: Deep Space Nine
 Orinoco, a fictional character in the book series The Wombles
 , a tanker that was renamed Rio Orinoco in 1981 and caused an oil spill in the Gulf of St. Lawrence

See also
Orénoque (1781 ship)
Orinoko, a novel by Arkady Fiedler
Oronoco, Minnesota
Oronoco Township, Minnesota
Oronoko Charter Township, Michigan
Oronoque, Kansas
Oronoque River, a river in Guyana
Oroonoko, a novel by Aphra Behn
Oronoque (estate), a Gilded-age estate in Stockbridge, Massachusetts